Nikolaos Ornithopoulos (born 7 February 1938) is a Greek chess player.

Biography
From the mid-1960s to the mid-1970s Nikolaos Ornithopoulos was one of Greek leading chess players.

Nikolaos Ornithopoulos played for Greece in the Chess Olympiads:
 In 1964, at second reserve board in the 16th Chess Olympiad in Tel Aviv (+2, =1, -3),
 In 1966, at second board in the 17th Chess Olympiad in Havana (+10, =2, -6),
 In 1968, at fourth board in the 18th Chess Olympiad in Lugano (+1, =3, -5).

Nikolaos Ornithopoulos played for Greece in the European Team Chess Championship preliminaries:
 In 1977, at fourth board in the 6th European Team Chess Championship preliminaries (+1, =1, -1).

In 1990s and 2000s Nikolaos Ornithopoulos participated in senior chess tournaments.

References

External links

1938 births
Living people
Greek chess players
Chess Olympiad competitors
20th-century Greek people